Spiritual warfare in China is a concept in several cultural groups of China of using various methods and devices believed to ward off supernatural evil or interfering forces.

One author writes of how the wood of the peach tree has been a key device in fighting evil spirits in China:

Peach-wood seals or figurines guarded gates and doors, and, as one Han account recites, "the buildings in the capital are made tranquil and pure; everywhere a good state of affairs prevails." Writes the author, further:

Elsewhere in China it is written that "In fighting evil spirits, an anji can invoke his personal sonma, for example, by offering a chicken. If the anji does not worship his sonma in a fitting manner, he may become sick, or the sonma may leave the anji altogether, causing him to lose his power."

In parts of China bordering and sharing the culture of Nepal, the practice of Shamanism can be found. It is reported that various kinds of shamans are engaged by evil spirits "in either a physical battle or a battle of wits." Shamans are often called upon to fight evil spirits, in many traditions. One story tells of a shaman who, unable to locate a demon who was causing illness to a victim, brought a story-singer, who sang a story of the defeat of a powerful demon so convincingly that the infesting demon came out to aid the demon in the song, and so was able to be defeated.

The Hmong people, found throughout Southeast Asia including in China have an ancient belief in evil spirits and have a well established set of rituals and traditions for encountering demons. Comparable efforts to fight evil spirits occur in Christianity (See Spiritual warfare (Christianity).

References

Superstitions of China
Chinese folklore